Peter Tancock (born 22 July 1940) is a British skier. He competed in the 4 x 7.5 kilometre relay event at the 1968 Winter Olympics.

References

1940 births
Living people
British male biathletes
British male cross-country skiers
Olympic biathletes of Great Britain
Olympic cross-country skiers of Great Britain
Biathletes at the 1968 Winter Olympics
Cross-country skiers at the 1968 Winter Olympics
Place of birth missing (living people)